The 1965 Nordic Athletics Championships was the third and final edition of the international athletics competition between Nordic countries and was held in Helsinki, Finland. It consisted of 34 individual athletics events, 22 for men and 12 for women. This covered a track and field programme plus a men's marathon race.

Finland won its third team title in the men's points classification with 161 points and dethroned Sweden in the women's team competition with a total of 77 points. Iceland took part in the men's competition only and had its first and only champion at this edition – Valbjörn Thorláksson in the decathlon. Among the athletes in attendance were 1962 European Athletics Championships medalists Stig Pettersson, Rainer Stenius and Pentti Eskola.

Berit Berthelsen of Norway was the athlete of the tournament, taking a sweep of the women's sprints from 100 metres to 400 metres as well as the long jump. Finland's Marjatta Mäkinen won the shot put and discus throw events. No man won an individual double at this edition. Nina Hansen won the women's pentathlon, making her the only athlete in the competition's history to win three straight titles in an event. Carl Fredrik Bunæs (twice 100 m champion) returned to win a third title, this time in 400 m. Athletes to defend their 1963 titles included Bengt Persson (steeplechase) and Bjørn Bang Andersen (shot put).

Medal summary

Men

Women

Points table

Men

Women

References
Nordic Championships. GBR Athletics. Retrieved 2018-04-29.

1965
Nordic Championships
Nordic Championships
International sports competitions in Helsinki
1960s in Helsinki
International athletics competitions hosted by Finland
Athletics in Helsinki